In Stereo was an Australian music group consisting of singer/songwriters Jakob Delgado, Chris Lanzon and Ethan Karpathy. The group were active from 2015 to 2018.

In 2015, In Stereo auditioned for season seven of The X Factor Australia singing "Style" by Taylor Swift. They made it to the top 12 and were mentored by Guy Sebastian. They were eliminated on 20 October, coming in eighth place. Shortly after they were eliminated, they started a mini web series known as the In Stereo Show which was uploaded to Facebook every Monday.

Karpathy left the group in December 2017 and Lanzon and Delgado announced the end of In Stereo in April 2018. Over four years, In Stereo released three EPs and four singles.

2015: The X Factor

 denotes having been in the bottom two.

2016—2018: Post X Factor
In April 2016, they released their debut EP She's Rock n Roll, it peaked at number 11 on ARIA Charts.

In Stereo toured Australia in April 2016 for the 'Honest' tour. 
In July, they released their second EP The Speed of Sound which peaked at number 3 on ARIA Charts.

On 9 December 2016, In Stereo released their single "Girlfriend".

On 7 July 2017, In Stereo released their third EP Day In, Day Out which peaked at number 1 on the Australian Pop Charts, doing an EP launch show shortly after the release on 10 July at Oxford Art Factory in Sydney. In Stereo toured Australia in September 2017 for the 'Day In Day Out' tour.

On 27 December 2017, Ethan Karpathy announced his departure from the band via his Instagram and Facebook accounts.

On 12 January 2018 In Stereo released "Cruel", their first single as a duo. The duo changed the styling of their name from In Stereo to instereo and received new artist pages of music streaming platforms. On 3 April 2018, the two officially announced on social media that they had split and gone different ways. Delgado said “After four years of unforgettable experiences, thousands of kilometres travelled and all the awesome shows we played, we have decided to end In Stereo”, adding “I would like to thank everyone who has supported In Stereo throughout the years. I’ll never forget this for as long as I live.” Delgado also implied that he would be releasing his own project in the near future.

Discography

Extended plays

Singles

Tours

The Honest Tour (2016)

The Speed of Sound Launch Shows (2016)

The Main Event, Dolly (2016)

Summer Party (2017)

Day In Day Out Tour (2017)

References

External links

2014 establishments in Australia
2018 disestablishments in Australia
Australian boy bands
Australian pop music groups
Australian dance music groups
Musical groups established in 2014
Musical groups disestablished in 2018
The X Factor (Australian TV series) contestants